The band member history of American R&B and pop group the Jackson 5 shows how the band has had different members of the Jackson family during its chronology, releasing music under the names the Jackson Brothers (1964–1965), the Jackson 5 (1965–1975, with Motown), and the Jacksons (1975–1989, with CBS).

Members
Jackie Jackson
Active: 1962–1990, 2001, 2012–

Tito Jackson
Active: 1962–1990, 2001, 2012–present 
Instruments: vocals, lead guitar, synthesizer

Jermaine Jackson
Active: 1962–1975, 1983–1990, 2001, 2012–present
Instruments: lead vocals, bass guitar

Marlon Jackson
Active: 1964–1985, 2001, 2012–present
Instruments: vocals, conga, tambourine, synthesizer, percussion

Michael Jackson
Active: 1964–1984, 2001
Instruments: lead vocals, conga, tambourine

Randy Jackson
Active: 1975–1989, 2001
Instruments: vocals, piano, keyboards, percussion, conga

Band lineups

References 

Jackson 5, The